Abderahim Najim (born 31 December 1954) is a Moroccan Olympic boxer. He represented his country in the light-flyweight division at the 1976 Summer Olympics. He lost his first match against Chan-Hee Park.

References

1954 births
Living people
Moroccan male boxers
Olympic boxers of Morocco
Boxers at the 1976 Summer Olympics
Light-flyweight boxers